Fox Point State Park is a Delaware state park on  along the Delaware River in New Castle County, Delaware in the United States. The park, which opened in 1995, has been built atop a former hazardous waste site that has been rehabilitated under an adaptive reuse program that was spearheaded by S. Marston Fox and the Fox Point Civic Association. Fox Point State Park is open for year-round use from 8:00 am until sunset. The park offers recreational opportunities on biking and pedestrian trails with picnic facilities, a playground and volleyball and horseshoes facilities. Fox Point State Park is just off Interstate 495 and is the northern terminus of Delaware's Coastal Heritage Greenway.

History

The creation of Fox Point State Park is largely the result of one man's dream. S. Marston Fox spent the last twenty-five years of his life working to transform a stretch of land along the Delaware River in northern Wilmington. The land on which Fox Point State Park sits was created by land fill by the Pennsylvania Railroad along its right of way on the bank of the Delaware River. The railroad was seeking to create additional industrial land for potential customers. Mr. Fox began his efforts to stop the filling process in 1958, and sought to have the land turned over to the people as public use land. The four mile (6.4 km) stretch of shoreline was not turned over to New Castle County until the late 1970s. Mr. Fox died in 1982, after which his crusade was taken up by David Ennis and Eugene Snell of the Fox Point Civic Association. The state of Delaware acquired the land in 1990 and began the process of remediating the hazardous waste site.

The soil at Fox Point State Park had been contaminated by industrial waste and sewage sludge. Environmental specialists were called in to construct the park in such a way that the health of employees and visitors would not be threatened. Funds provided by the State of Delaware's Hazardous Substance Cleanup Act were designated to use a commonly employed strategy to contain waste a landfills: a cap system. Layers of clean fill, sand, gravel and topsoil were placed atop and underneath the protective plastic.

The park was expanded when more remediation was performed in 2008. Following Tropical Storm Henri in 2003, the housing development of Glenville was flooded and most of its homes were condemned. Working with the Federal Highway Administration, the state removed 130,000 cubic yards of clean soil from Glenville in order to transform the site into restored wetlands to prevent future flooding. The clean soil was then transported to Fox Point where it was used to cap additional acreage. The project was awarded Delaware's Governors Excellence Award and the Federal Highway Administration's Environmental Excellence Award.

The Delaware Department of Natural Resources and Environmental Control continues to monitor and maintain the environmental protections at Fox Point State Park Sections of the park that have not undergone the remediation process are surrounded by mesh fences and are off limits to visitors, although more of the park land will be remediated and opened to the public in the future.

Recreation

Fox Point State Park's location along the Delaware River provides visitors with several scenic vistas and a view of the working river. The skyline of Philadelphia can be seen to the north and the Delaware Memorial Bridge can be viewed to the south. The park is near the shipping channel of the Delaware River and barges, container ships and tankers pass by regularly.
There are several signs on the shore of the river that provide information about the various watercraft that can be seen navigating the Delaware River.

In addition to the vistas, visitors to the park have access to extensive picnic facilities, volleyball courts, horseshoe pits, and a playground. Fox Point State Park is the northern terminus of the Coastal Heritage Greenway, which stretches from Wilmington south along the shore of Delaware Bay to Cape Henlopen State Park. It is also the eastern terminus of the Northern Delaware Greenway.
 
Fox Point State Park is located on the Atlantic Flyway. This brings a wide variety of migrating birds to the park.

Future development
Plans for further development include extensive remediation of the affected soils. Once the polluted soil is protectively contained, additional park infrastructure is planned. A  loop with fitness stations will be built. The area on the inside of the loop will be planted with a wide variety of wildflowers. This should lessen the environmental impact and cut down on maintenance costs. Plans for the construction of a multi-purpose building have been written, along with plans for an amphitheater, children's garden, and boat launch.

Nearby state parks
The following state parks are within  of Fox Point State Park:
Alapocas Run State Park (New Castle County)
Auburn Valley State Park (New Castle County)
Bellevue State Park (New Castle County)
Brandywine Creek State Park (New Castle County)
Fort Delaware State Park (New Castle County)
Fort DuPont State Park (New Castle County)
Fort Mott State Park (New Jersey)
Fort Washington State Park (Pennsylvania)
Lums Pond State Park (New Castle County)
Marsh Creek State Park (Pennsylvania)
Norristown Farm Park (Pennsylvania)
Parvin State Park (New Jersey)
Ridley Creek State Park (Pennsylvania)
Wilmington State Parks  (New Castle County)
White Clay Creek Preserve (Pennsylvania)
White Clay Creek State Park (New Castle County)

References

External links

Fox Point State Park

Parks in New Castle County, Delaware
State parks of Delaware
Protected areas established in 1995
1995 establishments in Delaware